Alexei Kopeikin (born 29 August 1983) is a Russian professional ice hockey forward who is currently an unrestricted free agent. He most recently played for HC Vityaz of the Kontinental Hockey League (KHL).

He previously played four seasons as captain with HC Sibir Novosibirsk before joining Vityaz as a free agent on July 2, 2016.

References

External links

1983 births
Living people
People from Angarsk
Amur Khabarovsk players
Avangard Omsk players
HC Sibir Novosibirsk players
HC Spartak Moscow players
Russian ice hockey forwards
HC Vityaz players
Zauralie Kurgan players
Sportspeople from Irkutsk Oblast